Daf Hobson BSC, (born Dafydd Llewelyn Hobson 1951 in Lancashire) is an English cinematographer. Daf Hobson is married to Dorothy Russell. They have two children, Joshua and Freya Russell-Hobson.

Early life
Daf went to school in Caernarfon on the North Wales coast. He studied 3D Design at Leeds Polytechnic (now Leeds Metropolitan University). During college, he worked at Leeds Playhouse, then Granada TV Manchester.

Filmography

Cinematographer

2008 Fallout (TV)
2007 The Murder of Princess Diana (USA TV)
2007 The Bad Mother's Handbook (TV)
2006 The Street (TV)
2005 The English Harem (TV)
2005 Messiah: The Harrowing (TV) 
2005 Cherished (TV) 
2004 Early Doors (TV)
2004 Trial & Retribution VIII (TV) 
2004 Suzie Gold (35mm Feature Film 2004) 
2002 Dr. Jekyll and Mr. Hyde (35mm TV) 
2001 Othello (TV)(Winner BAFTA Lighting & Photography and Royal TV Society Lighting & Photography) 
2001 Swallow (TV) 
2001 Sword of Honour (TV) 
2000 The Secret World of Michael Fry (TV) 
1999 Eureka Street (TV) (Winner IAFTA Lighting & Photography)
1999 Births, Marriages and Deaths (TV) 
1998 Bramwell: Loose Women (TV) 
1997 The Lakes (TV)(BAFTA Nomination) 
1997 Welcome to Sarajevo (35mm Feature Film 1996)
1996 The Tenant of Wildfell Hall (TV)(Royal TV Society Winner Camera)  
1996 The Vanishing Man (TV) 
1996 Guardians
1995 Go Now
1995 Bramwell Series One (TV) (Royal TV Society Winner Lighting and Photography)
1994 Family (TV) (BAFTA Winner Lighting and Photography)

External links

Daf Hobson BSC - Official Website
Rotten Tomatoes - Daf Hobson on Rotten Tomatoes

1951 births
Alumni of Leeds Beckett University
English cinematographers
Living people